Grant Township is a township in Barton County, Kansas, United States.  As of the 2010 census, its population was 55.

Grant Township was organized in 1879.

Geography
According to the USGS, it contains one cemetery, Saint Anns.

References
 USGS Geographic Names Information System (GNIS)

External links
 City-Data.com

Townships in Barton County, Kansas
Townships in Kansas